Amina Blancarte (born Helen Amina Blancarte Tirado in Mazatlán, Sinaloa, México) is a former model and former beauty queen.

Early career
Amina Blancarte was chosen Nuestra Belleza Sinaloa in 1994 and finished in the Top 6 in Nuestra Belleza México 1994. One year after she represented the country in Nuestra Belleza Internacional 1995 in Miami where she was the winner and the first Mexican to win this title. After this she entered the Centro de Educación Artística (CEA) to prepare for a career in TV Hostess. During her studies at CEA she stood out as a talented and driven student. Blancarte was TV Hostess in many programs in Mexico and the United States.

References

Mexican female models
Models from Sinaloa
People from Mazatlán
Living people
Year of birth missing (living people)